Castlefore Lough is a mesotrophic freshwater in northwest Ireland. Known for good coarse fishing, Castlefore Lough has limited bank fishing. The ecology of Castlefore Lough, and other Leitrim waterways, is threatened by curly waterweed, zebra mussel, and freshwater clam invasive species.

Etymology
The lake takes its name from the district of "Castlefore", meaning the "".

Geography
Castlefore Lough lies  due east of Keshcarrigan village, and  due west of Fenagh in south County Leitrim, northwest Ireland.

Ecology
Fish present in Castlefore Lough include "roach-bream hybrids", Roach, Perch, Bream (including. Skimmers), Tench, and Pike. The pike population is the "native Irish strain" ( meaning 'Irish Pike') not the other European Pike strain ( meaning 'strange or foreign fish').

Human settlement

From Prehistoric Ireland times, lake dwellers settled on a crannog at the eastern end of Castlefore Lough, with possibly two crannogs existing here. The human settlements near Castlefore lough are Keshcarrigan and Fenagh villages, and the townlands of Gubroe to the northwest, Killmacsherwell to the north, Annaghaderg to the south, and Leamanish to the southeast.

Poem
An old published poem titled "An Exile's Dream", praises the beautiful and picturesque scenery around Castlefore Lough.

"I sat down to rest and fell into a slumber, 
I thought I was back near my own native place, 
And roaming along by the bright crystal waters. 
The lovely blue waters of Castlefore Lake.

I stood for a while to admire its beauty 
And turned my eyes to that sweet little space. 
The Island far out where wild birds go a-nesting 
On the lovely blue waters of Castlefore Lake.

Then my gaze wandered up in another direction. 
To some beautiful swans, oh, what noise they did make. 
They splashed and they fluttered, but seemed quite contented 
On the lovely blue waters of Castlefore Lake.

A boat being near me, I took the advantage 
To go for a sail to some different place, 
I sailed straight across and enjoyed the fresh breezes 
On the lovely blue waters of Castlefore Lake.

On the opposite side of the lake I just landed. 
When I woke from my slumber in this far foreign place 
I felt happy and longed for to dream once again, on 
The lovely blue waters of Castlefore Lake''".

See also
 List of loughs in Ireland
 Keshcarrigan
 Fenagh

References

Citations

References

External links 

Castlefore